Helmut Lipfert (6 August 1916 – 10 August 1990) was a German Luftwaffe fighter ace and recipient of  Knight's Cross of the Iron Cross with Oak Leaves. Lipfert ranks as the world's thirteenth fighter ace. Lipfert was credited with 203 victories achieved in 687 combat missions. All his victories were claimed over the Eastern Front and included a P-51 Mustang, 41 Yakovlev Yak-1, 41 Yakovlev Yak-9 fighters, two four-engine bombers and 39 Ilyushin Il-2 ground-attack aircraft. He was shot down fifteen times, without being injured.

Early life and career
Lipfert was born on 6 August 1916 in Lippelsdorf, present-day a borough of Gräfenthal, at the time in Duchy of Saxe-Meiningen, as part of the German Empire. Following the compulsory labour service (Reichsarbeitsdienst), Lipfert joined the military service with Nachrichten-Abteilung 37 (37th Signals Battalion), a unit of 1st Panzer Division on 3 November 1937.

World War II
World War II in Europe had begun on Friday, 1 September 1939, when German forces invaded Poland. Lipfert, who held the rank of Unteroffizier (sergeant), participated in the Invasion of Poland and in the Battle of France as a member of the 1st Panzer Division. In early 1941, he transferred to the Luftwaffe where he trained as a fighter pilot. He was promoted to Fahnenjunker-Feldwebel (officer cadet) on 16 June 1942 and to Leutnant (second lientenant) on 1 August 1942.

Lipfert was then posted to the Ergänzungs-Jagdgruppe Ost (Supplementary Fighter Group, East) based at Saint-Jean-d'Angély, France and then via the Frontleitstelle Krakau, front dispatch center based at Krakau, to 6. Staffel (6th squadron) of Jagdgeschwader 52 (JG 52—52nd Fighter Wing) on 16 December 1942. At the time, JG 52 was based on the southern sector of the Eastern Front in the vicinity of Stalingrad. His 6. Staffel was commanded by Oberleutnant Rudolf Resch and subordinated to II. Gruppe (4th group) of JG 52 headed by Hauptmann Johannes Steinhoff. The Gruppe was based at an airfield near Morozovsk and fighting in the Battle of Stalingrad.

Eastern Front
On 18 December 1942, on one of his first combat missions, Lipfert made a forced landing in his Messerschmitt Bf 109 G-2 (Werknummber 14154—factory number) due to engine failure. He is remembered by contemporaries as a consistent, professional pilot and leader. He withdrew often from squadron mates into long periods of contemplation. On 22 January 1943, III. Gruppe moved to an airfield at Rostov-on-Don.

On 20 March 1943, Lipfert was appointed acting Staffelkapitän (squadron leader) of 4. Staffel (4th squadron) of JG 52. He replaced Leutnant Wolf-Dieter von Coester in this capacity who had been killed in action that day. Following the death of Oberleutnant Karl Ritzenberger on 24 May, Lipfert was transferred to take command of 6. Staffel (4th squadron) of JG 52. He was succeeded by Leutnant Heinrich Sturm as commander of 4. Staffel.

On 8 October, he shot down five Russian aircraft (kills 30 to 34). Four more are shot down on 5 December and his score raises to 72. By the end of 1943 his victories total had reached 80. On 5 April 1944, his 90th air victory had won him the Knight's Cross of the Iron Cross. Six days later, 11 April 1944, an "all-white Sturmovik" provided him with his 100th aerial victory. He was the 69th Luftwaffe pilot to achieve the century mark.

The last Germans had to evacuate from Crimea in May, retiring to Kherson. There, the Luftwaffe Gruppen were subjected  to near-constant Soviet bombing raids, and Lipfert's 6./JG 52, in particular, lost a number of aircraft. On 11 June 1944 he destroyed his first United States Army Air Forces (USAAF) four engined bomber, a Boeing B-17 Flying Fortress north-northwest of  Tătăruși, his 127th aerial victory. Two weeks later, on the 24 of June, he downed a Consolidated B-24 Liberator over Ștefănești in the historical Romanian region of Moldavia ("victim" number 128). His 150th claim came on 24 October 1944: a Yakovlev Yak-7 over Feherto, Hungary.

Group commander
Lipfert was appointed Gruppenkommandeur (group commander) of I. Gruppe of Jagdgeschwader 53 (JG 53—53rd Fighter Wing) on 15 February 1945. He thus replace Hauptmann Erich Hartmann who had briefly led the Gruppe after its former commander, Major Jürgen Harder, was transferred. Command of 6. Staffel of JG 52 was given to Leutnant Heinz Ewald. At the time, the Gruppe was based in Veszprém and had been fighting in the siege of Budapest, where German forces had surrendered on 13 February. The Gruppe then supported German forces in Operation Southwind, eliminating the Soviet bridgehead on the west bank of the river Hron, predominantly fighting over Esztergom. The following day, I. Gruppe again flew combat air patrols over Esztergom. That day, Lipfert claimed his first two aerial victories with JG 53 when he shot down a La-5 and Yak-3 fighter, taking his total to 181. By 25 February, German forces had eliminated the Soviet bridgehead west of the Hron. That day, I. Gruppe flew combat missions to Zvolen. On a morning mission, Lipfert claimed a Yak-9 fighter shot down.

On 26 February, water from the Váh started flooding the airfield at Piešťany. The airfield had to be abandoned and I. Gruppe first moved to Pápa before returning to Veszprém on 28 February.  Lipfert claimed his 183rd aerial victory, an Il-2 ground-attack aircraft, on 8 March. The following day, German forces attacked Soviet position on both sides of Lake Balaton during Operation Spring Awakening. Supporting this operation, I. Gruppe flew many missions to the combat areas near Zvolen and Székesfehérvár. On 11 March, Lipfert shot down a Yak-3 fighter near Sárbogárd and another Yak-3 near Siófok. From 12 to 17 March, I. Gruppe continued fighting in the vicinity of Székesfehérvár. In this timeframe, Lipfert claimed his 186th aerial victory on 13 March, his 187th and 188th on 14 March, and his 189th on 17 March. On 20 March, with Soviet forces advancing, ground combat shifted to the area north of Lake Velence and to Székesfehérvár. Flying his second mission of the day, Lipfert shot down two Il-2 ground-attack aircraft, the first near Székesfehérvár, the second near Várpalota. On 22 March, the airfield Veszprém was taken by Soviet forces and the Gruppe relocated to Pápa where they were joined by the Stab (headquarters unit) of Jagdgeschwader 76 (JG 76—76th Fighter Wing).

On 5 April, I. Gruppe moved from Fels am Wagram to Brno. Three days later, Lipfert claimed his 200th aerial victory in the vicinity of Hainburg an der Donau, west of Bratislava. He flew his last and 687th combat mission on 16 April, claiming a Yakovlev Yak-9 fighter shot down, taking his total to 203 aerial victories. The next day, he was awarded the Knight's Cross of the Iron Cross with Oak Leaves. He was the 837th member of the German armed forces to be so honored. The presentation was made by Generalleutnant Paul Deichmann, commanding general of I. Fliegerkorps (1st Air Corps), on 17 April.

After the dissolution of I./JG 53, Lipfert was transferred to 7./JG 52, until the end of the conflict. He claimed 27 unconfirmed victories. After the end of the war he was not turned over to the Soviet forces.

Later life
After the war, Lipfert became a school teacher, and was seldom seen by his war comrades. He died on 10 August 1990 in Einbeck.

Summary of career

Aerial victory claims
According to US historian David T. Zabecki, Lipfert was credited with 203 aerial victories. According to Spick, Lipfert was credited with 203 aerial victories claimed in approximately 700 combat missions. All of his aerial victories were claimed on the Eastern Front and includes two USAAF four-engine bombers claimed over Romania. Mathews and Foreman, authors of Luftwaffe Aces — Biographies and Victory Claims, researched the German Federal Archives and found records for 200 aerial victory claims, plus six further unconfirmed claims. This figure of confirmed claims includes 198 aerial victories on the Eastern Front and two on the Western Front, including one four-engined bomber.

Victory claims were logged to a map-reference (PQ = Planquadrat), for example "PQ 08693". These sectors were then subdivided into 36 smaller units to give a location area 3 × 4 km in size.

Awards
 Iron Cross (1939)
 2nd Class (12 March 1943)
 1st Class (29 April 1943)
 Front Flying Clasp of the Luftwaffe for fighter pilots in Gold (26 April 1943)
 Honor Goblet of the Luftwaffe on 13 December 1943 as Leutnant and pilot
 German Cross in Gold on 28 January 1944 as Leutnant in the 6./Jagdgeschwader 52
 Knight's Cross of the Iron Cross with Oak Leaves
 Knight's Cross on 5 April 1944 as Leutnant of the Reserves and Staffelführer of the 6./Jagdgeschwader 52
 837th Oak Leaves on 17 April 1945 as Hauptmann and Gruppenkommandeur of the I./Jagdgeschwader 53

Notes

Publications

 Lipfert, Helmut; Girbig, Werner (1993). The War Diary of Hauptmann Helmut Lipfert – JG 52 on the Russian Front 1943–1945. Atglen, PA: Schiffer Publishing. .

References

Citations

Bibliography

 
 
 
 
 
 
 
 
 
 
 
 
 
 
 
 
 
 
 
 

1916 births
1990 deaths
Luftwaffe pilots
People from Saalfeld-Rudolstadt
German World War II flying aces
People from Saxe-Meiningen
Recipients of the Gold German Cross
Recipients of the Knight's Cross of the Iron Cross with Oak Leaves
Reich Labour Service members
Military personnel from Thuringia